Blanket Independent School District is a public school district based in Blanket, Texas (USA) located in Brown County.  A portion of the district extends into Comanche County.

Finances
As of the 2010-2011 school year, the appraised valuation of property in the district was $37,947,000. The maintenance tax rate was $0.104 and the bond tax rate was $0.007 per $100 of appraised valuation.

Academic achievement
In 2011, the school district was rated "academically acceptable" by the Texas Education Agency.  Forty-nine percent of districts in Texas in 2011 received the same rating. No state accountability ratings will be given to districts in 2012. A school district in Texas can receive one of four possible rankings from the Texas Education Agency: Exemplary (the highest possible ranking), Recognized, Academically Acceptable, and Academically Unacceptable (the lowest possible ranking).

Historical district TEA accountability ratings 
2011: Academically Acceptable
2010: Recognized
2009: Recognized
2008: Academically Acceptable
2007: Academically Acceptable
2006: Academically Acceptable
2005: Academically Acceptable
2004: Academically Acceptable

Schools
In the 2011-2012 school year Blanket ISD operated three schools.
Blanket School (Grades PK-12)
Early Special Program (Grades PK-8)
Early Special Program (Grades 9-12)
Up until 2010, the district operated Blanket Elementary School (Grades PK-8).

Special programs

Athletics
Blanket High School participates in the boys sports of tennis, basketball, golf, track, cross country, and football. The school participates in the girls sports of basketball, tennis, golf, tennis, track, and cross country. For the 2012 through 2014 school years, Blanket High School will play six-man football in UIL Class 1A 6-man Football Division II.
Junior High boys participate in football, track, cross country, tennis, and basketball. Junior High girls participate in cheer, track, cross country, tennis, and basketball.

See also

List of school districts in Texas 
List of high schools in Texas

References

External links

School districts in Brown County, Texas
School districts in Comanche County, Texas